Charlaine Harris Schulz (born November 25, 1951) is an American author who specializes in mysteries. She is best known for her book series The Southern Vampire Mysteries, which was adapted as the TV series True Blood. The television show was a critical and financial success for HBO, running seven seasons, from 2008 through 2014. A number of her books have been bestsellers and this series was translated into multiple languages and published across the globe. 

Harris was born and raised in a small town in the Mississippi River Delta area of the United States. She now lives in Texas with her husband; they have three grown children and grandchildren. She began writing from an early age, and changed from playwriting in college to writing and publishing mysteries, including several long series featuring recurring characters.

Life and career
Harris was born and grew up in Tunica, Mississippi, in the Mississippi Delta. In her early work she wrote poems about ghosts and teenage angst. She began writing plays while attending Rhodes College in Memphis, Tennessee. Her most recent mysteries have been in the urban fantasy genre. 

After publishing two stand-alone mysteries, Harris began the lighthearted Aurora Teagarden books with Real Murders, nominated as a Best Novel 1990 for the Agatha Awards. Harris wrote several books in the series before the mid-1990s, when she began branching out into other works. She did not resume the series until 1999, with the exception of one short story in a Murder, She Wrote anthology titled "Murder, They Wrote".

In 1996, Harris published the first in the Shakespeare series, featuring cleaning lady detective Lily Bard, set in rural Arkansas. At the time, a New York Times interview with Harris noted that she "live[d] in small-town Arkansas". The fifth book in the series, Shakespeare's Counselor, was published in fall 2001, followed by the short story "Dead Giveaway", published in the Ellery Queen Mystery Magazine in December 2001. Harris has said she is finished with that series. 

Next Harris created The Southern Vampire Mysteries series, about a telepathic waitress named Sookie Stackhouse who works in a Northern Louisiana bar. The first book, Dead Until Dark, won the Anthony Award for Best Paperback Mystery in 2001. Each book follows Sookie as she tries to solve mysteries involving vampires, werewolves, and other supernatural creatures. The series has been published in Australia, New Zealand, Japan, Spain, Greece, Germany, the Netherlands, Belgium, France, Italy, Argentina, Poland, Serbia, Brazil, Great Britain, Ireland, Mexico, Norway, Finland, Sweden, Denmark, Lithuania, Hungary, Bulgaria, Portugal, Iceland, Czech Republic, Romania, Estonia, and Israel. Harris wrote thirteen novels in the series; the last, Dead Ever After, was published in May 2013. A supplemental book, After Dead, was published in October 2013. The second novel, Living Dead in Dallas, won the 2003 Lord Ruthven Award for Fiction, and the anthology The Complete Sookie Stackhouse Stories won the 2018 Ruthven Award for Fiction.

October 2005 marked the debut of Harris's new series, entitled The Harper Connelly Mysteries, with the release of Grave Sight. The series is told by a young woman named Harper Connelly, who after being struck by lightning, is able to locate dead bodies and to see their last moments through the eyes of the deceased. In October 2010, it was announced Harper Connelly's series had been optioned for a television series named Grave Sight.

2014 marked the debut of the Cemetery Girl series, a graphic novel series co-written with Christopher Golden and illustrated by Don Kramer.

Professionally, Harris is a member of the Mystery Writers of America and the American Crime Writers League. She is a member of the board of Sisters in Crime, and alternates with Joan Hess as president of the Arkansas Mystery Writers Alliance.

Personal life
In her personal life, Harris has long been married. She and her husband have three grown children and two grandchildren. She is a former weightlifter and karate student, she is also an avid reader and cinemaphile. Harris formerly resided in Magnolia, Arkansas, where she was the senior warden of St. James Episcopal Church, and as of 2017 lives in Texas.

Bibliography

Aurora Teagarden series (1990–present) 
1 Real Murders (1990) 
2 A Bone to Pick (1992) 
3 Three Bedrooms, One Corpse (1994) 
4 The Julius House (1995) 
5 Dead Over Heels (1996) 
6 "Deeply Dead" in Murder, They Wrote
7 A Fool and His Honey (1999) 
8 Last Scene Alive (2002) 
9 Poppy Done to Death (2003) 
10 All the Little Liars (2016) 
11 Sleep Like a Baby (2017)

Lily Bard (Shakespeare) series (1996–2001)
1 Shakespeare's Landlord (1996) 
2 Shakespeare's Champion (1997) 
3 Shakespeare's Christmas (1998) 
4 Shakespeare's Trollop (2000) 
5 Shakespeare's Counselor (2001) 0-312-27762-8
5.1 "Dead Giveaway" published in Ellery Queen Mystery Magazine (December 2001)

Sookie Stackhouse series (2001–2014)
For more detailed information see The Southern Vampire Mysteries/True Blood.

Harper Connelly series (2005–2009)
Grave Sight (2005) 
Grave Surprise (2006) 
An Ice Cold Grave (2007) 
Grave Secret (2009) ;

Graphic novels
 Grave Sight Part 1 (June 2011) 
 Grave Sight Part 2 (November 2011) 
 Grave Sight Part 3 (March 2012)

Cemetery Girl series (with Christopher Golden)
 Book One: The Pretenders (2014) .
 Book Two: Inheritance (2015) 
 Book Three: Haunted (2018)

Midnight, Texas Trilogy (2014–2016)
 Midnight Crossroad (May 2014)
 Day Shift (May 2015)
 Night Shift (May 2016)

Gunnie Rose series
 An Easy Death (2018)
 A Longer Fall (2020)
 The Russian Cage (2021)
 The Serpent in Heaven (2022)

Stand-alones
 Sweet and Deadly (1981) . republished in UK as Dead Dog
 A Secret Rage (1984) 
 Layla Steps Up (2010)
 A Taste of True Blood (2010)
 Indigo (2017)

Anthologies and collections

As editor
 Many Bloody Returns (September 2007; co-editor with Toni LP Kelner)
 Wolfsbane and Mistletoe (October 2008; co-editor with Toni LP Kelner)
 Crimes by Moonlight (April 2010)
 Death's Excellent Vacation (August 2010; co-editor with Toni LP Kelner)
 Home Improvement: Undead Edition (August 2011; co-editor with Toni LP Kelner)
 An Apple for the Creature (September 2012; co-editor with Toni LP Kelner)

Adaptations

Television

Her series of novels The Southern Vampire Mysteries was adapted into the show True Blood. The series lasted seven seasons and totaled 80 episodes. It was nominated for dozens of awards. True Blood aired on HBO. The show was also the most viewed show on HBO since The Sopranos.

In 2014, Hallmark Movies & Mysteries began adapting Harris' Aurora Teagarden novels into a series of television films, starring Candace Cameron Bure.

Harris's series Midnight, Texas was developed as a TV series by NBC and began airing on their network in 2017.

Video games
Dying for Daylight (February 2011)
 The first all new video game written by Charlaine Harris, released by iPlay Games; starring Dahlia
Based on Book 10: Dead in the Family

Shakespeare's Landlord - an interactive game (January 2018)
Video game adapted from Charlaine Harris' novel of the same name, developed by One More Story Games
Based on Book 1: Shakespeare's Landlord

See also

 True Blood
 Sookie Stackhouse
 Aurora Teagarden
 Midnight, Texas—a television series based on the book series
 List of crime writers
 Romance novel

References

External links

 
 Fantastic Fiction Author Page
 
 Charlaine Harris Collection (MUM00221) owned by the University of Mississippi Department of Archives and Special Collections
 Charlaine Harris's Lifestyle Blog
 Story Behind Cemetery Girl — Online Essay by Charlaine Harris

1951 births
20th-century American novelists
20th-century American women writers
21st-century American novelists
21st-century American women writers
American Episcopalians
American horror writers
American mystery writers
American women novelists
Anthony Award winners
Living people
Novelists from Mississippi
People from Magnolia, Arkansas
People from Tunica, Mississippi
People from Texas
Rhodes College alumni
Urban fantasy writers
Writers from Arkansas
Women science fiction and fantasy writers
Women horror writers
Women mystery writers
Inkpot Award winners